Chile Route 27 (Ruta 27 CH) is a main road in the northern portion of Chile. It runs  from San Pedro de Atacama to Paso de Jama. A short road off Route 27 heads north to Portezuelo del Cajón.

The sections Salar de Pujsa and Salar de Tara-Salar de Aguas Calientes of Los Flamencos National Reserve can be accessed by this road.

References

Roads in Chile
Transport in Antofagasta Region